The Thomas Durham School is a historic school building in Philadelphia which was built in 1909.  It was listed on the U.S. National Register of Historic Places in 1988.

The building was built as part of a major construction program after the School District of Philadelphia was reorganized and consolidated in 1905.  Between 1906 and World War I, the district built 44 elementary schools, one junior high school, and five senior high schools.  The architect of this program, Henry deCourcy Richards, used a number of plans in different architectural styles, such as Regency architecture, Colonial Revival, Georgian Revival, Classical Revival, Jacobethan, Mediterranean Revival, and Academic Gothic.  In some cases, he built multiple schools from each pattern, but varying the ornamentation between individual buildings.

The Thomas Durham School is one of his Regency designs.  It was one of his plainest designs for the district, and also one of the cheapest to build.  This may have resulted from its location in a predominantly African-American neighborhood.

The Thomas Durham School building is now occupied by Independence Charter School.

See also 

 National Register of Historic Places listings in Center City, Philadelphia
 Tanner Duckrey

References

External links

 Independence Charter School

School buildings completed in 1909
Colonial Revival architecture in Pennsylvania
School buildings on the National Register of Historic Places in Philadelphia
Rittenhouse Square, Philadelphia
Charter schools in Pennsylvania
1909 establishments in Pennsylvania